A constitutional referendum was held in Algeria on 13 October 1946 as part of a wider French constitutional referendum. The proposed new constitution was rejected by 61.6% of voters, with a turnout of 58.5%. However, it was approved by a majority of voters in France and other territories.

Results

References

1946 referendums
October 1946 events in Africa
Referendums in Algeria
Referendums in France
1946 in Algeria
Constitutional referendums in France